is a Japanese kami believed to be the local avatar (Gongen) of Buddhist bodhisattva Jizō. The cult originated in Shugendō practices on Mount Atago in Kyoto, and Atago Gongen is worshiped as a protector against fire. There are some nine hundred Atago Shrines around Japan.

See also
Gongen
Shinbutsu shūgō
Honji suijaku
Atago Shrine (Kyoto)
Atago Shrine (Tokyo)

References

Shugendō deities
Shinbutsu shūgō
Gongen
Kṣitigarbha
Tengu